Saving God is a 2008 Christian drama film written by Michael Jackson and directed by Duane Crichton. The film stars Ving Rhames, Dean McDermott and Ricardo Chavira, and was released on DVD and Blu-ray on October 18, 2008 by Cloud Ten Pictures and Clear Entertainment.

Plot 
Saving God follows ex-convict turned pastor Armstrong Cane (Ving Rhames) as he returns to his family neighborhood to preach. As he attempts to rebuild the now crime-ridden area, he also tries to help a young drug dealer named Norris (Dwain Murphy) turn his life around.

Cast 
 Cole Mellows as son
 Ving Rhames as Armstrong Cane
 Dean McDermott as Henry James / Blaze
 Ricardo Chavira as Rev. Danny Christopher
 Genelle Williams as Ashley Ellis
 Kate Todd as Sherri Butler
 K. C. Collins as Mike
 Richard Leacock as Officer Earl
 Kim Roberts as Dr. Munson
 Kedar as Deacon Jake
 Ardon Bess as Ken Salter
 Dwain Murphy as Norris Johns

Reception 
DVD Verdict's David Johnson felt the film was "well-acted, smartly paced, realistic and surprising in its plot twists" that achieves a more realistic feel through the persuasive performances of its actors. The Dove Foundation reviewer Edwin L. Carpenter considered the film to be "well written, directed and acted" and awarded the film its "Seal of family approval" and rated it "five Doves." Ted Baehr of Movieguide, writing for GoFish Productions, felt the film started in a predictable fashion and that the story was weak at times, but did praise its ending. He also felt Ving Rhames' performance was "stellar".

Awards 
Best Foreign Film – Drama at the 2009 International Family Film Festival
Best Director - Feature Narrative at the 2009 FirstGlance Hollywood 9 Awards
Official Selection at the 2009 Real to Reel International Film Festival

References

External links 
 
 

2008 films
Films about evangelicalism
Cloud Ten Pictures films
2008 drama films
Films about Christianity
2000s English-language films